Toposa (also Akara, Kare, Kumi, Taposa, Topotha) is a Nilo-Saharan language (Eastern Sudanic, Nilotic) spoken in South Sudan by the Toposa people.  Mutually intelligible language varieties include Jiye of South Sudan, Nyangatom of Ethiopia, Karimojong, Jie and Dodos of Uganda and Turkana of Kenya. Teso (spoken in both Kenya and Uganda) is lexically more distant.

Phonology

Consonants

All consonants (except, of course, for /w/ and /j/) can occur in labialized and palatalized forms.

Vowels

Toposa, like many Nilotic languages, has vowel harmony with two sets of vowels: a set with the tongue root advanced (+ATR) and a −ATR set.  +ATR is marked.  The vowel  is neutral with respect to vowel harmony.
All nine vowels also occur as devoiced, contrasting with their voiced counterparts.  These voiceless vowels occur primarily in prepause contexts.  Some Toposa morphemes consist only of a high voiceless vowel; the functional load appears to be much greater with the high vowels than with the lower.
Toposa has tone, which is grammatical rather than lexical.  Tone is used to mark case in nouns and tense in verbs.

Bibliography

References

Languages of South Sudan
Eastern Nilotic languages